Gap Fire may refer to:
 Gap Fire (2008), a 2008 wildfire in Santa Barbara, California
 Gap Fire (2016), a 2016 wildfire in Seiad Valley, California